Chkalov is a rural locality (a khutor) in Baranovskoye Rural Settlement, Nikolayevsky District, Volgograd Oblast, Russia. The population was 9 as of 2010.

Geography 
Chkalov is located in steppe on the left bank of the Volgograd Reservoir, 71 km east of Nikolayevsk (the district's administrative centre) by road. Krasnoye Znamya is the nearest rural locality.

References 

Rural localities in Nikolayevsky District, Volgograd Oblast